Mark Watters (born May 25, 1955) is an American composer of music for film and television.

Biography 
Watters is a six-time Emmy award-winning composer, conductor and arranger. He was born in Irving, Texas and majored in Saxophone at the University of Southern California where he was a member of Tau Kappa Epsilon fraternity. Mark served as the music director of the 1996 Summer Olympics, and the 2002 Winter Olympics. Watters has served as guest conductor for ensembles such as The Los Angeles Philharmonic, The London Symphony, The Detroit Symphony, The Dallas Symphony, and The Atlanta Symphony. In 2009, he co-conducted a nationwide tour of Star Wars: In Concert with Dirk Brosse. In August 2012, he conducted the Japanese tour featuring The Tokyo Symphony.

He is a former president of the Society of Composers & Lyricists and a former member of the ATAS Board of Governors.

Discography

Film 
Petal to the Metal - Disney
The Pebble and the Penguin - MGM
All Dogs Go to Heaven 2 - MGM
Doug's 1st Movie - Disney
Get a Horse! - Disney
Poor Papa - Disney
Africa Before Dark - Disney
Hungry Hobos - Disney

Direct-to-video 
Tiny Toon Adventures: How I Spent My Vacation - Warner Bros. (co-composed with Steven Bramson, Bruce Broughton, Don Davis, Albert Lloyd Olson, Richard Stone, and Stephen James Taylor)
The Return of Jafar - Disney
Aladdin and the King of Thieves - Disney
Babes in Toyland - MGM
An All Dogs Christmas Carol - MGM
Alvin and the Chipmunks Meet Frankenstein - Universal
Tom Sawyer - MGM / MCA Records
Alvin and the Chipmunks Meet the Wolfman - Universal
 Winnie the Pooh: A Very Merry Pooh Year - Disney
 Winnie the Pooh: Springtime with Roo - Disney
 My Little Pony: A Charming Birthday - Paramount / Hasbro / SD Entertainment
 The Cat That Looked at a King - Disney
 My Little Pony: Dancing in the Clouds - Paramount / Hasbro / SD Entertainment
 Candy Land: The Great Lollipop Adventure (songs only) - Paramount  / Hasbro / SD Entertainment
 Dinotopia: Quest for the Ruby Sunstone - Hallmark
 My Little Pony: Friends are Never Far Away - Paramount / Hasbro / SD Entertainment
 Pooh's Heffalump Halloween Movie - Disney
 My Little Pony: A Very Minty Christmas - Paramount / Hasbro / SD Entertainment
Kronk's New Groove - Disney
My Little Pony: The Princess Promenade - Paramount / Hasbro / SD Entertainment
Winnie the Pooh: Shapes and Sizes - Disney
Winnie the Pooh: Wonderful Word Adventure - Disney
Tom and Jerry: Shiver Me Whiskers - Warner Bros.
My Little Pony Crystal Princess: The Runaway Rainbow - Paramount / Hasbro / SD Entertainment
My Little Pony: A Very Pony Place - Paramount / Hasbro / SD Entertainment
Timon and Pumbaa's Wild About Safety - Disney
My Little Pony: Twinkle Wish Adventure - Shout! Factory / Hasbro / SD Entertainment
Once Upon a My Little Pony Time: So Many Ways to Play (theme music) (uncredited) - Hasbro
The Further Adventures of Thunderbolt - Disney

Television 
Medal of Honor
In a Child's Name - CBS
Tiny Toon Adventures - Warner Bros.
The Plucky Duck Show - Warner Bros.
Raw Toonage - Disney
Darkwing Duck - Disney
Goof Troop - Disney
Marsupilami - Disney
Taz-Mania - Warner Bros.
Bonkers - Disney
The Little Mermaid - Disney
Aladdin - Disney
The Bug Hunt - Disney
1996 Summer Olympics (opening and closing ceremonies)
All Dogs Go to Heaven: The Series - MGM
Boo to You Too! Winnie the Pooh - Disney
The Pink Panther - MGM
101 Dalmatians - Disney
The Lionhearts - MGM
Hercules - Disney
New True Life Adventures: Alaska: Dances of the Caribou - Disney
New True Life Adventures: Elephant Journey - Disney
New True Life Adventures: Sea of Sharks - Disney
New True Life Adventures: Everglades: Land of the Living Dinosaur - Disney
2002 Winter Olympics (opening and closing ceremonies)
The 74th Academy Awards (co-composed with John Williams) - ABC
It's a Very Merry Muppet Christmas Movie - NBC
Single Santa Seeks Mrs. Claus - Hallmark
The Long Shot - Hallmark
Meet the Santas - Hallmark
Movies Rock (theme music) - CBS
Have a Laugh! - Disney
Cars Toons - Disney
Composers on Composing
Merrie Melodies - Warner Bros.
Paradise - CBS
Noddy - PBS

Video games 
Disney Princess: Enchanted Journey - Disney Interactive Studios
Disney Fairies: Tinker Bell - Disney Interactive
Coraline - D3 Publisher
Ben 10 Alien Force: Vilgax Attacks - D3 Publisher
Toy Story 3 - Disney Interactive Studios / Disney Mobile Studios
Ben 10 Ultimate Alien: Cosmic Destruction - D3 Publisher
Disney Princess: My Fairytale Adventure - Disney Interactive Studios
Cars Mania - Disney Interactive

Theater 
Babes in Toyland - California Music Theater / Orange County Center for the Performing Arts
101 Dalmatians (stage musical) - The Arvada Center, Denver, Colorado
An Adventure of Robinson Crusoe (stage musical) - The Arvada Center, Denver, Colorado
The Raft of the Medusa - The Incline Theater Group, Santa Monica, California
Snitch - The Fountain Theatre, Los Angeles, California
Hamlet - Globe Playhouse, West Hollywood, California

Recordings, miscellaneous 
"Thinkin' About You" by Trisha Yearwood
2001 Seville Film Music Festival
"Because It's Christmas" by Barry Manilow - Arista Records
My Little Pony Live: The World's Biggest Tea Party (co-composed with Jon Baker) - VEE Corporation

Awards and nominations

Awards 
2008 Primetime Emmy Award - Outstanding Music Direction (Movies Rock)
2002 Primetime Emmy Award - Outstanding Music Direction (Opening Ceremony Salt Lake 2002 Olympic Winter Games)
 2001 News & Documentary Emmy Award - Outstanding Music (New True Life Adventures: Alaska: Dances Of The Caribou)
1997 Primetime Emmy Award - Outstanding Music Direction (Opening Ceremonies: Centennial Olympic Games)
1995 Daytime Emmy Award - Outstanding Music Direction and Composition - (Aladdin)
1992 Daytime Emmy Award - Outstanding Music Direction and Composition - (Tiny Toon Adventures - "The Love Disconnection")

Nominations 
2000 Daytime Emmy Award - Outstanding Original Song - "Why Not Be Happy" - (All Dogs Go to Heaven: The Series)
1999 Daytime Emmy Award - Outstanding Music Direction and Composition, and Outstanding Original Song - "Roar" - (The Lionhearts)
1997 Primetime Emmy Award - Outstanding Original Song (Opening Ceremonies: Centennial Olympic Games)
1997 Daytime Emmy Award - Outstanding Original Song - (All Dogs Go to Heaven: The Series)
1994 Daytime Emmy Award - Outstanding Music Direction and Composition - (The Little Mermaid)
1993 Daytime Emmy Award - Outstanding Music Direction and Composition - (Goof Troop - "Goof Troop Christmas: Have Yourself a Goofy Little Christmas")
1993 Daytime Emmy Award - Outstanding Music Direction and Composition - (Raw Toonage)

References

External links 
  for Mark Watters (includes sound clips)
 

1955 births
American film score composers
American male film score composers
American television composers
Animated film score composers
Living people
Musicians from Texas
People from Irving, Texas